Alfredo "Chocolate" Armenteros (4 April 1928 – 6 January 2016) was a Cuban trumpeter. He played with artists such as Arsenio Rodríguez, Generoso Jiménez, Chico O'Farrill, Orchestra Harlow, Eddie Palmieri, Cachao and Sonora Matancera. Due to his characteristic approach to Afro-Cuban trumpet playing as well as his extensive recording career, several monographs have been written on his music.

Life and career

Armenteros was born on April 4, 1928, in Santa Clara, Las Villas Province, Cuba. He first began playing in a band led by the sonero/composer René Álvarez called Conjunto Los Astros and soon after with Arsenio Rodríguez. The nickname "Chocolate" was bestowed on him owing to a case of mistaken identity, when someone took him for Kid Chocolate, the champion boxer. After the Cuban Revolution, Armenteros moved to New York, where he lived until his death.

Armenteros went on to play with José Fajardo, Beny Moré, Tito Puente, César Concepción, Machito, Wynton Marsalis, Eddie Palmieri, Marcelino Guerra, Charlie Palmieri, John Santos, Israel "Cachao" López, Noro Morales, Johnny Pacheco, and many others. He was a member of La Sonora Matancera from 1977 to 1980. He died of prostate cancer on 6 January 2016.

Discography

Solo albums 
Chocolate... En El Rincon (Salsoul Records, 1976)
Y Sigo Con Mi Son (SAR Records, 1979)
Monsieur Chocolate Prefiero El Son (SAR Records, 1980)
Chocolate Dice (SAR Records, 1982)
Chocolate y Su Sexteto Rompiendo Hielo (Caiman Records, 1984)
Chocolate & His Cuban Soul (Caiman Records, 1997)

With Generoso Jiménez 
Ritmo (Kubaney, 1957)

With Mongo Santamaría and La Lupe 
Mongo Introduces La Lupe (Riverside, 1963)

With Orlando Marin 
Qué chévere (Alegre, 1964)

With Orchestra Harlow 
Heavy Smokin'  (Fania Records, 1965)
Gettin' Off / Bajándote (Fania, 1966)

With Eddie Palmieri 
Champagne (Tico Records, 1968)
Justicia (Tico, 1969)
Superimposition (Tico, 1970)Vamonos Pa'l Monte (Tico, 1971)Lucumí, Macumba, Voodoo (Epic, 1978)

 With Grupo Folklórico y Experimental Nuevayorquino Concepts in Unity (Salsoul, 1975)

 With Cachao Cachao y su Descarga 77 (Salsoul, 1977)Dos (Salsoul, 1977)Master Sessions, Volume 1 (Epic, 1994)Master Sessions, Volume 2 (Epic, 1995)

 With Machito Machito!!!  (Timeless 1983)

 With Cedar Walton Eastern Rebellion 4 (Timeless, 1984)

 With Kip Hanrahan Tenderness (American Clavé, 1990)

With El Trabuco VenezolanoEl Trabuco Venezolano Vol. II'' (YVKCT con músiC.A., 1979)

References

External links

1928 births
2016 deaths
Afro-Cuban jazz trumpeters
Cuban jazz musicians
Salsa musicians
Deaths from cancer in New York (state)
Deaths from prostate cancer